General elections were held in the Bechuanaland Protectorate on 1 March 1965, the country's first election under universal suffrage. The result was a landslide victory for the Bechuanaland Democratic Party, with Seretse Khama becoming Prime Minister. Following the elections, the country became independent as Botswana on 30 September 1966, at which point Khama became President.

Campaign
The elections were contested by three main parties; the Bechuanaland Democratic Party led by Khama, the Bechuanaland People's Party led by Philip Matante and the Bechuanaland Independence Party led by Motsamai Mpho. There was also a single independent candidate, G.E.N. Mannathoko, who ran in Tati West. In the Lobatsi and Barolong constituency, there were two candidates from the Bechuanaland People's Party, one of which represented the Motsete branch.

Despite acceptance that the BDP was likely to win easily, there was widespread interest in the elections. The BDP was seen as a moderate party with responsible leaders and realistic policies; in contrast the leaders of the other parties were perceived to be quarrelsome and overly ethnocentric. Three BDP candidates were elected unopposed in Ghanzi, Kgalagadi and Kweneng West.

Results

References

Elections in Botswana
Bechuanaland
General
Election and referendum articles with incomplete results
Bechuanaland